The 1941–42 Idaho Vandals men's basketball team represented the University of Idaho during the 1941–42 NCAA college basketball season. Members of the Pacific Coast Conference, the Vandals were led by first-year head coach  and played their home games on campus at Memorial Gymnasium in Moscow, Idaho.

Center Ray Turner set the Northern Division scoring record with 192 points in sixteen games (12.0 ppg).

Alumnus Wicks had returned to Moscow after a decade in Pocatello at the UI-Southern Branch. He entered the U.S. Navy in late 1942 during World War II, and returned to coach in the 1946–47 season. In the meanwhile , the basketball program was led by acting athletic director James "Babe" Brown, who coached the freshmen this season.

References

External links
Sports Reference – Idaho Vandals: 1941–42 basketball season
Gem of the Mountains: 1942 University of Idaho yearbook – 1941–42 basketball season
Idaho Argonaut – student newspaper – 1942 editions

Idaho Vandals men's basketball seasons
Idaho
Idaho
Idaho